Emanuel Kozačinski (ukr. Manuїl (Mihaїl) Kozačínsьkiй; Yampil, then Imperial Russia, now Ukraine, 1699 — Slutsk, Belarus, 15 August 1755) was a writer, pedagogue, actor and theater worker.

Biography
Kozačinski studied philosophy in Moscow until 1720, after which he continued his education on Kiev Theological Academy. During his studies in Kiev, he traveled across lands inhabited by Slavs and Germans. Once he got a degree, Kozačinski started working as an associate at the Academy, teaching junior classes.

On the invitation of Metropolitan Vikentije Jovanović, Kozačinski traveled from Kiev to Sremski Karlovci in 1733, accompanied with a group of professors. He started to work as a teacher of Slavic-Latin schools (Collegium slavono-latino carloviciense) which was already established at the time. During his tenure, schooling was largely improved and organized on the syllabus school system invention during the era of Peter the Great.

The first recorded theatrical performance, "The Death of Tsar Uroš", was presented in the school of Emanuel Kozačinski in Karlovci. Written by Kozačinski, it remained in manuscript and waited 62 years to reappear, then published and adapted by Jovan Rajić, the author's disciple. The Baroque drama was Traedokomedija centered about the subject of the death of Stefan Uroš V, which was first performed in June 1734. The play was very popular and later performed in Novi Sad and Zrenjanin with rearrangement done by Jovan Rajić.

Emanuel Kozačinski was a director of all schools in Sremski Karlovci during 1735-1736  and afterwards rector of all Slavic-Latin schools on the territory of Metropolitanate of Karlovci. There he wrote textbooks, namely Artis oratoriae libri IV (1735). This was at a time during the development of humanistic education of the Western-style among the Serbs. Some of the textbooks like De poesi seu de ligate oratione were written by an anonymous Serbian author in 1729.

His placement as the head of a network of schools was heavily criticized by priests and other Serbian Orthodox Church officials on account of Emanuel not being a member of the clergy, which forced Metropolitan Vikentije (Jovanović) to ordain him into the priesthood.

Facing numerous plots and protests after the death of Vikentije, his protector, Emanuel went to Vienna. Later, he worked as a teacher in Novi Sad for a year before leaving for Kiev.

Upon his return to Kiev, Emanuel was reinstalled as a professor at the Kiev Academy associated with the Pechersk Lavra monastery and he also started to work for a local theater company, writing a play Obraz strastej mira sego obrazom stražduščago Hrista ispravi sja, which he also directed in 1739. A noted professor of philosophy and theology, Kozačinski served as a deputy of the Academy's rector Silvester Kuljapk. Emanuel was made the head of a welcome committee established in 1744 for the visit of Elizabeth of Russia, and for that purpose, he wrote several works in her honour including a play Blagoutrobija Marka Avrelija Antonina. Kozačinski left the Academy in 1746 because of a dispute with staff members and went on to pursue his career as a cleric in Vydubychi Monastery.

Emanuel Kozačinski left numerous works: rhetoric, poetry and philosophy textbooks, songs, psalms, speeches, dramas. He is best known for his book on Aristotle, and also considered the best Aristotle scholar among Orthodox Christians of the era.

He died of jaundice and was buried in Sluck.

Selected works 
Traedokomedije, 1734.
Blagoutrobija Marka Avrelija Antonina, 1744.

See also
 Joakim Vujić
 Marko Jelisejic
 Jovan Rajić
 Arkadije Pejic
 Antonije Hadžić

References

External links
Istorijat Gimnazije u Sremskim Karlovcima

1699 births
1755 deaths
18th-century Serbian writers
Christian writers
Ukrainian writers
18th-century actors